Tamaurice Nigel "Tee" Martin (born July 25, 1978) is an American football coach and former quarterback who is the quarterbacks coach for the Baltimore Ravens of the National Football League (NFL). He previously served as an assistant coach at the University of Tennessee, University of Southern California, University of Kentucky, University of New Mexico, North Atlanta HS, North Cobb HS and Morehouse College.

Martin played college football at Tennessee where he led the team to a national championship in 1998 and was drafted by the Pittsburgh Steelers in the fifth round of the 2000 NFL Draft. During his six seasons of playing in the National Football League (NFL) and the Canadian Football League (CFL), Martin played for the Pittsburgh Steelers, Rhein Fire, Philadelphia Eagles, Oakland Raiders and Winnipeg Blue Bombers.

Early years
Martin attended and played high school football at Williamson High School.

Playing career

College
While at the University of Tennessee, Martin played college football under head coach Phillip Fulmer from 1996 to 1999. Martin was a backup to Peyton Manning during his freshman and sophomore years at the University of Tennessee. During his junior season, Martin led the 1998 Tennessee Volunteers football team to a 13–0 record and a Fiesta Bowl victory over Florida State, winning the school its first NCAA Division I-A national football championship since 1951. He was teammates with running back Jamal Lewis in his early years at Tennessee and wide receiver Peerless Price, who each went on to play in the NFL.

In the 1998 season, Martin broke the NCAA record for consecutive completions. Against South Carolina, Martin completed his first 23 passes. Combined with a completion on his last pass the previous week against Alabama, Martin's string of 24 consecutive completions and 95.8% completion percentage set new records. Martin broke the Southeastern Conference record of Ole Miss' Kent Austin, which was 20 consecutive. He broke the NCAA record for completions over multiple games with 23 consecutive over two games, which was shared by Southern Cal's Rob Johnson and Maryland's Scott Milanovich. In addition, he broke the one-game record of 22 straight completions set by Iowa's Chuck Long in 1984. Lastly, his 95.8% completion percentage broke the previous best single-game completion percentage of 92.6% set by UCLA's Rick Neuheisel in 1983.

In 1999, Martin led the Vols to their second consecutive BCS bowl, a 31–21 loss to #3 Nebraska in the Fiesta Bowl. During Martin's two years as a starter at Tennessee, the Vols were 11–1 over six major conference foes, (2–0 vs. Alabama, 2–0 vs. Auburn, 2–0 vs. Georgia, 2–0 vs. Vanderbilt, 2-0 vs. Kentucky, and 1–1 vs. Florida).

Collegiate statistics

Professional

Martin was drafted in the fifth round with the 163rd overall pick in the 2000 NFL Draft by the Pittsburgh Steelers. In 2004, Martin was released as a member of the Oakland Raiders after four NFL seasons. Martin spent one season in the NFL Europe league. During the 2002 season, he helped lead the Rhein Fire to a league best 7–3 record. The Fire lost in the World Bowl, falling 20–26 to the Berlin Thunder.

Coaching career

Morehouse College
Martin began his coaching career as the passing game coordinator at Morehouse College in 2006.

North Cobb HS
In 2007, Martin joined North Cobb High School as their passing game coordinator and quarterbacks coach.

North Atlanta HS
In 2008, Martin joined North Atlanta High School as their offensive coordinator and quarterbacks coach.

New Mexico
In 2009, Martin was hired by the University of New Mexico as their quarterbacks coach under head coach Mike Locksley.

Kentucky
In 2010, Martin joined as the wide receivers coach at the University of Kentucky under head coach Joker Phillips. In 2010, Martin was given an additional role as passing game coordinator.

USC
In February 2012, Martin was hired as the wide receivers coach at the University of Southern California under head coach Lane Kiffin. He had been linked with jobs at both Alabama and Oregon previously. News of his hiring at USC was broken by a tweet by quarterback Matt Barkley. Martin replaced Ted Gilmore who left to take a job at the Oakland Raiders. On December 18, 2015, Martin was promoted to offensive coordinator for the Trojans under head coach Clay Helton.  On December 27, 2018, after a 5–7 season, Martin became a casualty of a staff shakeup and was fired from the position.

Tennessee
On January 15, 2019, Martin joined the University of Tennessee, his alma mater, as their assistant head coach and wide receivers coach under head coach Jeremy Pruitt.

Baltimore Ravens
On February 6, 2021, Martin was hired by the Baltimore Ravens as their wide receivers coach under head coach John Harbaugh, replacing David Culley, who departed to become the head coach of the Houston Texans.

On February 22, 2023, Martin was made Quarterbacks coach, replacing James Urban.

Personal life
Martin was born and raised in Mobile, Alabama. He is married to his wife, Toya Rodriguez, a recording artist known professionally as Toya. His oldest child, Amari Rodgers, played as a wide receiver for the Houston Texans. Amari is a Clemson University alumnus, where he recorded over 1,000 receiving yards during his senior season. Martin's middle child, Kaden, is a highly recruited football and baseball prospect who is committed to the University of Miami as a baseball player but will also walk onto the football team. Martin's youngest son, Cannon, was born in 2012.

Martin owns Playmakers Sports, a company specializing in sports event planning, quarterback training, and skills development and is a college football expert on Comcast Sports Southeast program Talkin' Football. He is a quarterback coach for the Nike Elite 11 Quarterback Camps, Nike Football Training Camps, and has trained many high school and Division 1 quarterbacks. In 2008, Martin created the "Dual Threat" Quarterback Camp and Academy in Atlanta, Georgia.

References

External links
 Collegiate statistics at Sports-Reference.com
 Baltimore Ravens coaching bio
 Tennessee Volunteers bio

1978 births
Living people
Sportspeople from Mobile, Alabama
Players of American football from Alabama
African-American players of American football
American football quarterbacks
Tennessee Volunteers football players
Pittsburgh Steelers players
Rhein Fire players
Philadelphia Eagles players
Oakland Raiders players
American expatriate sportspeople in Germany
African-American players of Canadian football
Canadian football quarterbacks
Winnipeg Blue Bombers players
African-American coaches of American football
Morehouse Maroon Tigers football coaches
High school football coaches in Georgia (U.S. state)
New Mexico Lobos football coaches
Kentucky Wildcats football coaches
USC Trojans football coaches
Tennessee Volunteers football coaches
Baltimore Ravens coaches
21st-century African-American sportspeople
20th-century African-American sportspeople